The Savages is a 2007 American black comedy-drama film written and directed by Tamara Jenkins.  It stars Laura Linney, Philip Seymour Hoffman, and Philip Bosco.

It had its world premiere at the 2007 Sundance Film Festival on January 19, 2007. It was released on November 28, 2007, by Fox Searchlight Pictures. It received critical acclaim. At the 80th Academy Awards, it earned two nominations: Best Actress (for Linney) and Best Original Screenplay (for Jenkins). At the 65th Golden Globe Awards, it was nominated for Best Actor in a Musical or Comedy (for Seymour Hoffman).

Plot
After drifting apart emotionally over the years, two single siblings—Jon and Wendy, the younger of the two—band together to care for their estranged, elderly father, Lenny, who is rapidly slipping into dementia. Wendy and Jon first travel to Sun City, Arizona to attend the funeral of their father's girlfriend of 20 years.  When they arrive, they are told that their father signed a non-marriage agreement and will not have rights to any of her property.  They then move him to a nursing home in Buffalo, where Jon is a theater professor working on a book about Bertolt Brecht. Wendy, who is an aspiring, but unsuccessful, playwright, moves from New York City to help establish their father in Buffalo.

Neither of the siblings is close with Lenny. It is implied that he was a physically and emotionally abusive father when Jon and Wendy were growing up and they cut him out of their lives. They were also abandoned by their mother at a young age. Their dysfunctional family life appears to have left Wendy and Jon emotionally crippled and unable to sustain a relationship. Wendy is sleeping with an unattainable married man 15 years her senior and Jon cannot commit to a Polish woman who must return to Kraków after her visa expires.

Their visits to the nursing home and their father's eventual death allow them to reevaluate their lives and to grow emotionally. In the end, Wendy has broken up with her married lover, but has adopted his dog, which he had planned to put down. She is also seen working on the production of her play about their terrible childhood, while  Jon is leaving for a conference in Poland where it is suggested he may reconnect with the woman he had let go. The film closes with Wendy running with her lover's dog alive, running with the aid of a wheeled hip cast, suggesting a mode of flawed yet persevering life for both siblings.

Cast

Production 
Filming took place from 10 April to early June 2006 in the Buffalo area of New York.

Reception

Critical reception
The film received very favorable reviews from critics. As of October 21, 2020, the review aggregator Rotten Tomatoes reported that 90% of critics gave the film positive reviews, based on 173 reviews, and an average rating of 7.5/10. The site's consensus states: "Thanks to a tender, funny script from director Tamara Jenkins, and fine performances from Philip Seymour Hoffman and Laura Linney, this film delivers a nuanced, beautifully three-dimensional look at the struggles and comforts of family bonds." Metacritic reported the film had an average score of 85 out of 100, based on 35 reviews, indicating "universal acclaim".

Time magazine's Richard Schickel named the film #7 of his Top 10 Movies of 2007, and praises both the cast and writer-director: 

The film appeared on many critics' top 10 lists of the best films of 2007.
 1st - Carina Chocano, Los Angeles Times (tied with The Diving Bell and the Butterfly)
 3rd - Ella Taylor, LA Weekly (tied with Away from Her)
 3rd - Sheri Linden, The Hollywood Reporter
 5th - David Edelstein, New York magazine
 5th - Marjorie Baumgarten, The Austin Chronicle
 6th - Lawrence Toppman, The Charlotte Observer
 7th - Kirk Honeycutt, The Hollywood Reporter
 7th - Peter Hartlaub, San Francisco Chronicle
 7th - Richard Schickel, TIME magazine
 8th - Frank Scheck, The Hollywood Reporter
 8th - Nathan Rabin, The A.V. Club
 8th - Ray Bennett, The Hollywood Reporter
 9th - A. O. Scott, The New York Times (tied with Away from Her)
 10th - Carrie Rickey, The Philadelphia Inquirer
 10th - Manohla Dargis, The New York Times (7-way tie)

Awards
 80th Academy Awards
 Academy Award for Best Actress (Laura Linney)
 Academy Award for Best Original Screenplay (Tamara Jenkins)
 Central Ohio Film Critics Association Awards
 Actor of the Year (Philip Seymour Hoffman) -- WON (Also for: Before the Devil Knows You're Dead and Charlie Wilson's War)
 Chicago Film Critics Association Awards
 Best Actress (Laura Linney)
 Best Screenplay, Original (Tamara Jenkins)
 65th Golden Globe Awards
 Best Performance by an Actor in a Motion Picture – Musical or Comedy (Philip Seymour Hoffman)
 Gotham Awards
 Best Ensemble Cast (Philip Bosco, Philip Seymour Hoffman, Laura Linney)
 Independent Spirit Awards
 Best Cinematography (W. Mott Hupfel III)
 Best Director (Tamara Jenkins)
 Best Male Lead (Philip Seymour Hoffman) -- WON
 Best Screenplay (Tamara Jenkins) -- WON
 London Critics Circle Film Awards
 Actress of the Year (Laura Linney)
 Los Angeles Film Critics Association Awards
 Best Screenplay (Tamara Jenkins) -- WON
 National Society of Film Critics Awards
 Best Screenplay (Tamara Jenkins) -- WON
 Nilsson Awards for Film
 Best Picture
 Best Actor in a Leading Role (Philip Seymour Hoffman)
 Best Actress in a Leading Role (Laura Linney)
 Best Actor in a Supporting Role (Philip Bosco)
 Best Original Screenplay (Tamara Jenkins)
 Best Cast
 Best Original Score
 Online Film Critics Society Awards
 Best Actress (Laura Linney)
 San Francisco Film Critics Circle Awards
 Best Screenplay - Original (Tamara Jenkins) -- WON
 Satellite Awards
 Best Actress in a Motion Picture, Drama (Laura Linney)
 Women Film Critics Circle Awards
 Best Actress (Laura Linney) -- WON
 Writers Guild of America Awards
 Best Original Screenplay (Tamara Jenkins)

References

External links

 
 
 
 
 

2007 films
American black comedy films
American comedy-drama films
Fox Searchlight Pictures films
2007 independent films
Films about dysfunctional families
Films about siblings
Films set in Sun City, Arizona
Films set in New York (state)
Films shot in New York (state)
Films scored by Stephen Trask
Films produced by Anne Carey
Films directed by Tamara Jenkins
Films with screenplays by Tamara Jenkins
2007 black comedy films
2007 comedy-drama films
2000s English-language films
2000s American films
Films about disability